Galopagomyia is a genus of true flies in the family Sarcophagidae.

Species
G. inoa Walker, 1849

References 

Sarcophagidae
Schizophora genera